Events from the year 1973 in Pakistan.

Incumbents

Federal government
President: Zulfikar Ali Bhutto (until 13 August), Fazal Ilahi Chaudhry (starting 14 August)
Prime Minister: Zulfikar Ali Bhutto (starting 14 August)
Chief Justice: Hamoodur Rahman

Governors
Governor of Balochistan: Ghaus Bakhsh Bizenjo (until 15 February); Nawab Akbar Khan Bugti (starting 15 February)
Governor of Khyber Pakhtunkhwa: Arbab Sikandar Khan (until 15 February); Aslam Khattak (starting 15 February)
Governor of Punjab: Ghulam Mustafa Khar (until 12 November); Sadiq Hussain Qureshi (starting 12 November)
Governor of Sindh: Mir Rasool Bux Talpur (until 15 February); Begum Ra'ana Liaquat Ali Khan (starting 15 February)

Events 
 February, 1973 raid on the Iraqi embassy in Pakistan
 10 April, the 1973 Constitution of Pakistan is passed.
14 August, Quaid-e-Awam is elected Prime Minister of Pakistan.
 October, 1973 Arab-Israeli War

Births
 August 15 – Adnan Sami, music composer, singer, pianist

Births
 November 7  –  ((Adnan Aslam)),  Writer and lover

See also 
 1972 in Pakistan
 Other events of 1973
 1974 in Pakistan
 List of Pakistani films of 1973
 Timeline of Pakistani history

References

 
1973 in Asia